The 2007 Bedford Borough Council election took place on 3 May 2007 to elect members of Bedford Borough Council in England. This was on the same day as  other local elections.

Summary

Election result

References

Bedford
Bedford Borough Council elections
2000s in Bedfordshire